Posht Giaban (also Romanized as Posht Gīābān) is a village in Poshtkuh Rural District, in the Central District of Khash County, Sistan and Baluchestan Province, Iran. At the 2006 census, its population was 175, in 30 families.

References 

Populated places in Khash County